Maureen Christa Pojas Wroblewitz (born June 22, 1998), also known as Maureen Wrob, is a Filipino actress, beauty queen, and model best known for winning the fifth season of Asia's Next Top Model. She represented the Philippines in the competition and became the first Filipina to win.

Early life
Maureen Christa Pojas Wroblewitz was born on June 22, 1998, in Riyadh, Saudi Arabia. She is the third of four daughters of a Filipino mother, Mariefe Pojas Wroblewitz, and a German father, Matt Wroblewitz. She lived in Riyadh for 12 years before relocating to Germany after her mother died. When she was 15 years old, she was scouted by a modeling agent on Instagram, and moved to the Philippines to pursue a modeling career. Before her participation on Asia's Next Top Model in 2017, she was a part-time model and student.

Career

Asia's Next Top Model
After auditioning for Asia's Next Top Model, Wroblewitz was chosen as one of the 14 finalists on the show's fifth season. During her run on the show, Wroblewitz received the highest score of the week three times and landed in the bottom two twice. She was one of the top three contestants for the cycle's final show, alongside contestants Minh Tu Nguyen from Vietnam and Shikin Gomez from Malaysia. Wroblewitz was crowned the winner of the competition during the final episode. She was the first representative from the Philippines to win the contest. As the winner of the competition, she received a Subaru Impreza, a cover and fashion spread in the July issue of Nylon Singapore, and a chance to obtain a modeling contract with Storm Model Management in London.

2017–present
Wroblewitz has appeared on the Filipino shows Tonight with Boy Abunda, News5, Rated K, and CNN Philippines. She is the face and ambassador of Asus and Palmolive. She is also an ambassador for the ICanServe Foundation, which helps cancer survivors. In September 2018, Wroblewitz appeared on season 6 of Asia's Next Top Model as Subaru Ambassador. A week later, she became a co-host of the Filipino variety show Eat Bulaga!.

In 2021, she signed a contract with Star Magic as Maureen Wrob.

Representing Pangasinan, Wroblewitz was announced as one of the Top 28 delegates that will compete for the Miss Universe Philippines 2021 crown on September 30, 2021, in Bohol. She placed first runner-up to Beatrice Luigi Gomez.

Filmography

Film

Television

Music videos

Personal life
On May 30, 2017, Wroblewitz was in a relationship with singer Juan Karlos Labajo, until they broke up on June 10, 2022.

See also

List of Asia's Next Top Model contestants
Asia's Next Top Model

References

External links 
 
 
 

1998 births
Living people
21st-century Filipino actresses
Filipino female models
Next Top Model winners
Filipino people of German descent
German people of Filipino descent
People from Riyadh
People from Manila
Star Magic
Miss Universe Philippines winners
Filipino film actresses
Filipino television actresses
Filipino expatriates in Saudi Arabia
Saudi Arabian people of Filipino descent
Saudi Arabian people of German descent